Transphosphoribosidase may refer to:
 Adenine phosphoribosyltransferase, an enzyme
 Hypoxanthine phosphoribosyltransferase